In baseball, a slide is the action of a player, acting as a baserunner, who drops his body to the ground once he is very close to the base he is approaching and slides along the ground to reach the base.  Sliding is widely considered to be an essential component of baserunning in both youth and professional baseball, though not precisely for the same reason.

A baserunner may slide into a base in a number of different ways and for a number of perceived reasons, including to avoid a tag out, to avoid overrunning the base, and to interfere or avoid contact with the defensive player protecting the base.  Players determine whether they will benefit by sliding in a particular game situation.  Adult amateur players may also consider the question of whether or not the increased risk of injury will make a slide worthwhile.

Methods of sliding
There are many different ways to slide, involving different ways of attempting to avoid the tag, reaching to touch the base, or trying to contact or avoid collision with the defensive player. Since the defense generally expects a slide, sometimes a baserunner trying to avoid being tagged out will not slide directly towards the base, but rather to a side away from where the ball is coming, and then reach back to touch the base.  

Players generally slide feet-first but sometimes also use a head-first technique. Strictly speaking, going headfirst into a base constitutes more of a dive than a slide, but the term "slide" is still commonly used.  This alternate method has been used in Major League Baseball at least since the middle-1880s when the innovation was popularized by the St. Louis Browns of the American Association. Yet even in the majors, it remained relatively uncommon until it became popularized by Pete Rose in the 1960s.  Headfirst sliding has since become a common practice for various players on all levels of professional baseball, but it is often restricted on the amateur level.

Reasons for sliding

Avoiding a tag out

On plays in which the baserunner may be tagged out by the opposing defensive player covering the base, the baserunner's body being down on the ground presents the lowest-profile target for the defensive player to tag. This makes it slightly more difficult for the defensive player to apply the tag in time to put out the baserunner.

Avoiding overrunning the base
Sliding helps a runner stop his forward momentum through the friction created between the body and the ground, thus reducing the likelihood that he will run past the base after touching it. This is important because in most cases a runner is in jeopardy of being tagged out if he loses contact with the base (the most common exception is that a batter-runner may overrun first base when initially reaching that base as long as he immediately returns to first base without attempting to advance to second base). Because the runner must balance the need to reach a base as quickly as possible with the need to avoid overrunning the base, sliding provides a rapid means for the runner to decelerate, allowing the baserunner to run at top speed as long as possible before needing to slow down.

Interfering with the defensive player (take-out slide)

Sliding can sometimes be used as a means of interfering with the play of the opposing defensive player who is covering the base being approached. For example, when it is possible that a double play might occur, and the baserunner approaching second base has already been put out, he might still try to slide toward the defensive player who intends to throw the ball to first base.  If the defensive player moves away from second base as he prepares to throw the ball toward first, the baserunner may still slide directly toward the defensive player, even though that means sliding away from second base itself.  This has the effect of hampering that defensive player's ability to complete the play, either directly by making physical contact with him, or indirectly by distracting him by making him fearful of such contact. A slide performed exclusively for the purpose of hampering the play of the defense is called a "take-out slide".

Whether a particular instance of a take-out slide is legal within the rules of baseball is a judgement call made by the umpire, usually based upon how close the baserunner comes to the base they are approaching during the slide. If a baserunner strays too far from the base when attempting a take-out slide, the umpire may declare the slide to be an example of illegal interference and call an extra out. As a general (but not absolute) guideline, even if the baserunner clearly slides toward the defensive player and away from the base, so long as the baserunner comes close enough to the base that he is able to touch it with some part of his body during the slide, the slide will be ruled to be legal.  On the flip side, the fielder will often be granted the neighborhood play under such circumstances.

Avoiding collision or injury from errant throw
Particularly for younger players, proper sliding technique has been shown to protect the runner and fielder from colliding and can prevent the runner from being hit by an errant throw.  For this reason, most youth baseball leagues now advise teaching proper sliding technique at a young age and urge kids to slide feet-first into any base (except first base) whenever there is a potentially close play.  This concept is somewhat more controversial in adult amateur baseball/softball leagues since the risk of injury from sliding increases with age.

Speed impact of sliding

The television series MythBusters tested participants' baserunning speed with and without sliding, and found that in cases where the runner needs to stop on the base, sliding into that base instead of staying upright provided a split second of advantage, suggesting the more rapid deceleration as the key.  However, when removing the need to stop, the general belief within baseball circles is that remaining upright and running all the way to the base at top speed allows a baserunner to reach the base faster than sliding. Consequently, on plays during which neither being tagged out nor being put in jeopardy by overrunning the base is at issue (e.g., when approaching first base after having batted the ball and nobody is trying to make a tag play), players are usually advised not to slide. Nonetheless, this conventional wisdom is not universally accepted, and as such, some players may feel that sliding will get them to the base more quickly and will thus choose to do so despite advice to the contrary.

Risks associated with sliding
One study in the American Journal of Sports Medicine followed seven softball and three baseball teams in Division I of the NCAA, and found the overall incidence of injuries sustained while sliding was 9.51 per 1000 slides. Softball players had about twice the incidence of sliding injuries as baseball players in the study. 11% (four out of 37) of the injuries caused the player to miss more than 7 days of participation.

Because baseball shoes are spiked on the bottom, sliding with the spikes up increases the probability of injury to the defensive player covering the base. Knowledge of this fact can often increase the defensive player's fear of the possible contact from an impending slide and thus increase his distraction while attempting to make a play. Ty Cobb developed nine different ways to slide into a base.

References

Baseball terminology